Sanford is a city in the U.S. state of Florida and the county seat of Seminole County. It is located in Central Florida and its population was 61,051 as of the 2020 census.

Known as the "Historic Waterfront Gateway City", Sanford sits on the southern shore of Lake Monroe at the head of navigation on the St. Johns River. Native Americans first settled the area thousands of years before the city was formed. The Seminoles arrived in the area in the 18th century. During the Second Seminole War in 1836, the United States Army established Camp Monroe and built a road now known as Mellonville Avenue.

Sanford is home to Seminole State College of Florida and the Central Florida Zoo and Botanical Gardens. Its downtown attracts tourists with shops, restaurants, a marina, and a lakefront walking trail. The Orlando Sanford International Airport, in the heart of the town, functions as the secondary commercial airport for international and domestic carriers in the Orlando metropolitan area.

Attractions in Sanford
 The Central Florida Zoo and Botanical Gardens
 Local Parks
 Fort Mellon Park
 The Paw Park Sanford
 Park on Park
 The Wayne Densch performing arts center
 Annual Oktoberfest(second weekend of October)
 Alive After Five (Second Thursday of every month in downtown)
 Sanford Museum
 Central Florida Soapbox Derby
 Historic Sanford Memorial Stadium
 Theater West End

City initiatives

The city's RiverWalk trail is a bike/walk/run trail that was completed in 2004. The ten-foot wide paved walkway spans a distance of several miles in Sanford's downtown area along the waterfront of Lake Monroe. Phase 2, which adds over 3000 feet to the trail, was completed in 2014. Phase 3 is expected to be complete by 2020.

The city completed multimillion-dollar streetscapes of 1st Street and Sanford Avenue in its historic downtown, using brick pavers, creating wider sidewalks, and adding trees, flowers, and benches.

Sanford is connected to the central Florida commuter railway SunRail, with the station 2 miles from the downtown.

To support green initiatives, Sanford has added five electric car charging stations. The city is proposing to replace streetlamp bulbs with LED lights.

In 2012, the city launched the "Imagine Sanford" initiative, which asks all Sanford residents to get involved in city planning by submitting and voting on improvement ideas via the city's Imagine Sanford website. The city of Sanford also launched a redesigned city government website in 2012.

History

Early history
The Mayaca or Jororo Indians inhabited the shores of Lake Monroe at the time of European contact. By 1760, however, war and disease had decimated the tribe, which would be replaced by the Seminole Indians.  Florida was acquired by the United States from Spain in 1821, but the Seminole Wars would delay settlement.  In 1835, the Seminoles burned the port of Palatka on the St. Johns River, then the major artery into Central Florida from the East Coast.  Consequently, an army garrison was established upstream, on the southern side of Lake Monroe near a trading post.  Established as Camp Monroe in 1836, the camp was enclosed by log breastwork on three sides but open to the river, with approximately 300 men based there. The camp was attacked by Indians on February 8, 1837.  It would be strengthened and renamed Fort Mellon in honor of Captain Charles Mellon, the sole American casualty.

General Zachary Taylor had a road built connecting a string of defenses from Lake Monroe to Fort Brooke (now Tampa).  The town of Mellonville was founded around Fort Mellon in 1842 by Daniel Stewart.  In 1845, Florida became a U.S. state. That same year, Mosquito County was renamed Orange County and the county seat was moved from Enterprise to Mellonville. Orange groves were planted, with the first fruit packing plant built in 1869.  In 1870, "General" Henry Shelton Sanford bought  to the west of Mellonville and laid out the community of Sanford.  Believing it would become a transportation hub, he called it "The Gateway City to South Florida."

Sanford imported two colonies of Swedes (totaling about 150 adults) as indentured servants  to labor a year for their travel
expenses. The Swedes would do the back-breaking work of establishing a new town and clearing the sub-tropical wilderness in advance of creating a citrus empire, arriving by steamboat in 1871. Incorporated in 1877 with a population of 100, Sanford absorbed Mellonville in 1883.  The South Florida Railroad ran a line from Sanford to Tampa, later the Jacksonville, Tampa and Key West Railroad ran a line to Jacksonville, and the area became the largest shipper of oranges in the world.  Arriving by steamer in April 1883, President Chester A. Arthur vacationed a week at the Sanford House, a lakeside hotel built in 1875 and expanded in 1882.

In 1887, the city suffered a devastating fire, followed the next year by a statewide epidemic of yellow fever.  When the Great Freeze of 1894 and 1895 ruined the citrus industry, farmers diversified by growing vegetables as well. Celery was first planted in 1896, and because of this Sanford is nicknamed the "Celery City."

On December 1, 1891, merchant William Clark and registered African American voters of Goldsboro incorporated as a town just to the southwest of Sanford.

In 1878, Mrs. Henry Sanford created the first library for public use in Sanford. A room was provided with a few books and a paid librarian. The initial library failed. In 1889, Mrs. Thrasher and Mrs. A.M. Deforest attempted to revive the library project with the aid of the Wednesday Club, the president, Mrs. Brown encouraged the women to begin fundraising efforts. The effort's fundraising progress was slow and sporadic. A Subscription library was established in a storefront on First Street. Mrs. Duver was the librarian at this location. The library later moved to Magnolia Avenue next to the theatre at this location the library was run by volunteers. The library grew at this location, until it moved in 1914 to the Women's Club on Oak Avenue. An official Public Library was built and opened in 1924 on 5th Street. This library was supported by the City of Sanford.

20th century
In 1911, the community of Sanford Heights seceded from Sanford, because of discord over municipal services provided by Sanford. This added to concerns that Sanford's ability to expand would be constrained by the surrounding towns of Goldsboro, Georgetown and Sanford Heights, as well as Lake Monroe to the west. Florida State Representative and former Sanford mayor Forrest Lake led legislative efforts to curtail Sanford Heights' ability to incorporate as an independent entity. Goldsboro was also a target in Forrest Lake's annexation process, prompting Goldsboro's leaders to start a letter writing campaign to local newspapers. On April 6, 1911, the Sanford city council passed a resolution to annex Goldsboro and on April 26, 1911, the Florida legislature passed the Sanford Charter Bill, dissolving the incorporation of both Sanford and Goldsboro, and reorganizing Sanford as a city that included Goldsboro within its boundaries.

In 1913, Sanford became the county seat of Seminole County, created from Orange County.  Agriculture continued to dominate the economy until 1940, when it proved cheaper to cultivate produce in frost-free South Florida.

Naval aviation
In 1942, Naval Air Station Sanford was established, which conducted operational training in the Lockheed PV-1 Ventura, Lockheed PBO Hudson, Grumman F4F/General Motors FM-1 Wildcat and the Grumman F6F Hellcat. At its peak in 1943–45, NAS Sanford was home to approximately 360 officers, 1500 enlisted men and 150 WAVES and included an auxiliary airfield to the east near Lake Harney known as Outlying Field Osceola. The base was inactivated and reduced to caretaker status in 1946, but was reactivated in 1950 in response to the Korean War and the Cold War. A major construction program ensued, with NAS Sanford redeveloped as a Master Jet Base for carrier-based Douglas A-3 Skywarrior and later North American A-5A and RA-5C Vigilante aircraft.  At its peak in the mid-1960s, the base was home to nearly 4000 military personnel, comprising the air station personnel complement, an Aircraft Intermediate Maintenance Department, the Navy Dispensary, the Marine Barracks, a Replacement Air Group/Fleet Replacement Squadron for the RA-5C, and nine deployable Fleet RA-5C squadrons that routinely deployed aboard large aircraft carriers to the Mediterranean and the Pacific. The latter were heavily engaged in combat operations during the Vietnam War.

As a result of the increasing costs of the Vietnam War and concurrent federal domestic spending related to President Lyndon Johnson's Great Society social programs, NAS Sanford was one of several stateside military installations identified for closure by the Department of Defense in 1967.  Flight operations were rapidly scaled down during 1968 as the squadrons of Reconnaissance Attack Wing ONE transferred to the former Turner AFB, renamed Naval Air Station Albany, Georgia.  This resulted in a significant economic downturn for the City of Sanford and Seminole County with the departure of all military personnel and their families. The airfield was conveyed to the City of Sanford via quitclaim deed by the General Services Administration (GSA) in 1969, renamed Sanford Airport and redeveloped as a general aviation facility. Subsequently renamed Sanford Regional Airport, then Central Florida Regional Airport, the airport commenced commercial airline service in 1995 and was renamed Orlando Sanford International Airport the following year.  The Navy's presence is commemorated at the airport by two historical markers and the NAS Sanford Memorial Park, which was dedicated on Memorial Day in May 2003 and includes a restored RA-5C Vigilante on loan from the National Naval Aviation Museum that was placed on permanent static display at the entrance to the commercial airline terminal.

Tourism
The opening of Walt Disney World Resort in October 1971 shifted the economy of Central Florida away from agriculture, military installations, defense/aerospace industries, and the NASA manned and unmanned space programs, and further towards tourism, service industries and residential development, the center of which is Orlando.  But because of Sanford's former preeminence as a trade center, the city retains a significant collection of older commercial and residential architecture, on streets shaded by live oaks hung with Spanish moss.  Its location on Lake Monroe and access to the navigable waterway of the St. Johns River has made it Central Florida's additional center for numerous marinas, allowing access for pleasure boats and commercial vessels to and from the Atlantic Ocean and the Intracoastal Waterway via Jacksonville and Mayport to the north.

Jackie Robinson
Sanford Field, built in 1926, was the location where Jackie Robinson first took the field in 1946 to play a member of a racially-integrated baseball team.

In 1946, Robinson arrived at Daytona Beach, Florida, for spring training with the Montreal Royals of the Class AAA International League, a minor league affiliate of the Brooklyn Dodgers. Since the Dodgers organization did not own a spring training facility, training took place at several local baseball stadiums, including Sanford Field.

Robinson's presence on the team was controversial in racially charged Florida. He was not allowed to stay with his white teammates at the team hotel, and many other local towns prevented the team from playing while he was part of the roster. The police chief in Sanford had threatened to cancel the game there if Robinson was to play. Robinson joined his team despite the threat, but the uproar from the mainly white audience in the stands caused him to be escorted off the field and he was not able to play.

Historic Sanford Memorial Stadium was built in 1951 near the site of the old Sanford Field as the Spring Training Facility of the New York Giants. The ballpark is located just south of Lake Monroe on Mellonville Avenue, less than a mile from Historic Downtown Sanford. Other Major League stars have played in the Sanford stadiums, including Babe Ruth, Willie Mays, Tim Raines, and David Eckstein.

21st century
Sanford was in the news in 2012 due to the killing of Trayvon Martin and the actions taken by the Sanford Police Department.

A city streetscaping project began in 2004 as city leaders sought to attract new businesses and visitors to downtown. By 2016, downtown Sanford was becoming known as a center for craft beer production in Central Florida, with two microbreweries, a home brewing supplier, and at least five other pubs focused on craft beers.

Geography
Sanford is bordered by Lake Mary to the southwest and to the north by Lake Monroe and DeBary.

Climate

Like the rest of Central Florida, Sanford experiences a warm humid subtropical climate with dry warm winters and wet hot summers. The dry season lasts November–May, while the wet season is from June–September.

Demographics

According to the 2020 census, Sanford had a population of 61,051 with 22,616 households. There were 2.61 persons per household and the population per square mile was 2,589.2. 

By age, the population was split with 6.4% under 5 years old, 23.3% under 18 years old, and 12.4% 65 years and over. 49.2% of the population were female persons. 

By race, the population was split with 48.7% white, 28.2% black or African American, 0.2% American Indian or Alaska Native, 3.3% Asian, 9.3% two or more races, and 26.6% Hispanic or Latino. There were 2,821 veterans living in the city. And 15.6% of the population were foreign born persons. 

The median value of owner-occupied housing units was $196,100. The median gross rent was $1,255. 947.7% of the households had a computer and 86.9% had a broadband internet subscription. 

89.3% of the population 25 years and older were high school graduates or higher and 25.9% of that same population had a Bachelor’s degree or higher.

Transportation and infrastructure

Aviation
The Orlando Sanford International Airport (SFB) provides international and commuter airline service for central Florida. Approximately 2.9 million passengers used SFB in 2017.

Bicycling
Sanford's Riverwalk is a key bike route following Lake Monroe and passing through Sanford's downtown. By 2020, it will link up with a greater network of trails as part of Florida's Coast to Coast connector—linking the west and east coasts of central Florida.

Bus
Sanford has multiple Lynx bus routes serving various destinations including its historic downtown, Seminole State College, the Sanford Sunrail Station, and its mall (Seminole Towne Center).

Rail

SunRail, the Central Florida commuter rail system, serves the city out of a new station off State Road 46. A new trolleybus (route and schedule) provides service between Sunrail and the historic downtown.

Roads
Sanford is near the northern end of the I-4 Corridor between Daytona Beach and Orlando. The State Road 417 or Seminole Expressway begins in Sanford at Interstate 4 and forms the Eastern Beltway around Orlando ending at Walt Disney World Resort.

Major Routes

Water
Sanford was historically a hub for Central Florida transportation as a port on the St. Johns River. Today, it has a downtown marina that includes free day slips for boaters visiting the downtown.

Education

Higher education
Seminole State College of Florida

High schools
Crooms Academy of Information Technology
Seminole High School

Middle schools
Sanford Middle School

Millennium Middle School

Elementary schools

All Souls Catholic School (K–8)
 Bentley Elementary School
 Goldsboro Elementary Magnet School
 Hamilton Elementary School of Engineering & Technology
 Idyllwilde Elementary Future Ready Academy
 Midway Elementary School of the Arts
 Pine Crest Elementary School of Innovation
 Wicklow Elementary School for Global Pathways
 Wilson Elementary School

Public Library
Sanford is served by the North Branch Library of the Seminole County Public Library. It is located at 150 N. Palmetto Avenue, Sanford, Florida 32771.

Notable people

 Ray-Ray Armstrong, professional football player
 Red Barber, sports announcer
 Zinn Beck, former professional baseball player
 Jeff Blake, professional football player
 Reggie Branch, professional football player
 Alwyn Cashe, US Army non-commissioned officer and recipient of the Medal of Honor
 Jim Courier, professional tennis player
 Gabe Davis, professional football player
 David Eckstein, former professional baseball player
 Rick Eckstein, baseball coach and scout
 Trinity Fatu, professional wrestler
 Elvira Garner, author and illustrator
 Joseph C. Hutchinson, lieutenant general in the Florida National Guard
 Trayvon Martin, shooting victim killed in 2012
 Tim Raines, professional baseball player
 Marty Raybon, Lead singer of country music group Shenandoah
 Bill Swaggerty, professional baseball player
 Mary Lou Zoback, seismologist and geophysicist

Gallery

References

External links

City of Sanford official website

 
Cities in Seminole County, Florida
County seats in Florida
Cities in the Greater Orlando
Populated places established in 1877
Populated places on the St. Johns River
Sanford family
Cities in Florida
1877 establishments in Florida